The iPhone (retroactively referred to as the iPhone 2G, iPhone 1 or original iPhone) is the first iPhone model and the first smartphone designed and marketed by Apple Inc. After years of rumors and speculation, it was officially announced on January 9, 2007, and it was released in the United States on June 29, 2007.

Development of the iPhone as a product began in 2005 and continued in complete secrecy until its public unveiling. The device broke with prevailing mobile phone designs by eliminating most physical hardware buttons and eschewing a stylus for its finger-friendly touch interface, featuring instead only a few physical buttons and a touch screen. It featured quad-band GSM cellular connectivity with GPRS and EDGE support for data transfer, and it used continuous internet access and onboard processing to support features unrelated to voice communication. Its successor, the iPhone 3G, was announced on June 9, 2008.

The iPhone quickly became Apple's most successful product, with later generations propelling it to become the most profitable company at the time. The introduction of the App Store allowed established companies and startup developers to build careers and earn billions of dollars, via the platform, while providing consumers with new ways to access information and connect with other people. The iPhone largely appealed to the general public, as opposed to the business community BlackBerry and IBM focused on at the time, and, by integrating existing technology and expanding on usability, the iPhone turned the smartphone industry "on its head".

History 

In 1999, Apple CEO Steve Jobs envisioned an Apple touchscreen product that the user could interact with directly with their fingers rather than using a stylus. The stylus was a common tool for many existing touchscreen devices at the time including Apple's own Newton, launched in 1993. He decided that the device would require a triple layered capacitive multi-touch touch screen, a very new and advanced technology at the time. This helped with removing the physical keyboard and mouse, the same as was common at the time for tablet computers, human machine interfaces and point of sale systems. Jobs recruited a group of Apple engineers to investigate the idea as a side project. When Jobs reviewed the prototype and its user interface, he saw the potential in developing the concept into a mobile phone to compete with already established brands in the then emerging market for touch screen phones. The whole effort was called Project Purple 2 and began in 2005. Apple purchased the "iphone.org" domain in December 1999.

Apple created the device during a secretive and unprecedented collaboration with Cingular Wireless, now part of AT&T. The development cost of the collaboration was estimated to have been $150 million over a thirty-month period. Apple rejected the "design by committee" approach that had yielded the Motorola ROKR E1, a largely unsuccessful collaboration with Motorola. Instead, Cingular Wireless gave Apple the liberty to develop the iPhone's hardware and software in-house. The original iPhone was introduced by Steve Jobs on January 9, 2007 in a keynote address at the Macworld Conference & Expo held in Moscone West in San Francisco, California. In his address, Jobs said, "This is a day that I have been looking forward to for two and a half years," and that "today, Apple is going to reinvent the phone". Jobs introduced the iPhone as a combination of three devices: a "widescreen iPod with touch controls"; a "revolutionary mobile phone"; and a "breakthrough Internet communicator".

Six weeks prior to the iPhone's release, the plastic screen was replaced with glass, after Jobs was upset that the screen of the prototype he was carrying in his pocket had been scratched by his keys. The quick switch led to a bidding process for a manufacturing contractor that was won by Foxconn, which had just opened up a new wing of its Shenzhen factory complex specifically for this bid.

Release 

The iPhone was released in the United States on June 29, 2007 at the price of $499 for the 4 GB model and $599 for the 8 GB model, both requiring a 2-year contract. Thousands of people were reported to have waited outside Apple and AT&T retail stores days before the device's launch; many stores reported stock shortages within an hour of availability. To avoid repeating the problems of the PlayStation 3 launch, which caused burglaries and even a shooting, off-duty police officers were hired to guard stores overnight.

It was later made available in the United Kingdom, France, Germany, the Republic of Ireland, and Austria in November 2007.

Six out of ten Americans surveyed said they knew before its release that the iPhone was coming.

Post-release 
The iPhone's main competitors in both consumer and business markets were considered to be the LG Prada, LG Viewty, Samsung Ultra Smart F700, Nokia N95, Nokia E61i, Palm Treo 750, Palm Centro, HTC Touch, Sony Ericsson W960, Sony Ericsson C905 and BlackBerry. The iPod Touch, a touchscreen device with the media and internet abilities and interface of the iPhone but without the ability to connect to a cellular network for phone functions or internet access, was released on September 5, 2007. At the same time, Apple significantly dropped the price of the 8 GB model (from $599 to $399, still requiring a 2-year contract with AT&T) while discontinuing the 4 GB model. Apple sold the one millionth iPhone five days later, or 74 days after the release. After receiving "hundreds of emails" upset about the price drop, Apple gave store credit to early adopters.

A 16 GB model was released on February 5, 2008 for $499, the original launch price of the 4 GB model. Apple released an SDK on March 6, 2008, allowing developers to create the apps that would be available starting in iPhone OS version 2.0, a free upgrade for iPhone users. On June 9, Apple announced the iPhone 3G, which began shipping July 11. The original iPhone was discontinued on July 15; total sales volume came to 6,124,000 units.

Hardware

External hardware (screens, materials, etc) 
The iPhone's back cover is made out of  aluminum, a soft metal. The iPhone's screen is a 320x480 resolution LCD screen at 163 ppi that measures about 3.5 inches diagonally, much bigger than other phones at the time, and the iPhone was the first mobile phone with multi-touch technology. The rear camera on the iPhone has a resolution of 2 megapixels and also features geotagging. The iPhone has four total buttons and a single switch: a power and sleep button, a volume up and volume down button, a silent/ringer switch, and a home button positioned in the bottom center of the face of the phone. The home button, when pressed, would send the user back to the home screen from whatever app they were currently using.

Internal hardware (motherboard, system-on-chip, etc.) 

The iPhone featured a Samsung 32-bit ARM microprocessor, underclocked from its stock 620 MHz to a slower 412 MHz to increase battery life. The iPhone also included several sets of sensors, including an accelerometer, a proximity sensor, and an ambient light sensor. Similar to the iPod Touch, the iPhone also featured a 3.5 millimetre auxiliary headphone jack. The phone also had a 3.7 V 1400 mAh Lithium-ion battery built in it.

Software 

At the time of its unveiling in January, Steve Jobs claimed: "iPhone runs OS X" and runs "desktop-class applications", but at the time of the iPhone's release, the operating system was renamed "iPhone OS".

The original iPhone supported three major versions of the operating system before it was discontinued: iPhone OS 1, 2, and 3. The last update the original iPhone received was iPhone OS 3.1.3, as iPhone OS 3.2 was intended for the iPad.

Software history 

The original operating system for the original iPhone, iPhone OS 1, featured Visual Voicemail, multi-touch gestures, HTML email, Apple's Safari web browser, threaded text messaging, an "iPod" music and video player app, a dedicated YouTube app and a Maps app powered by Google Maps. It also included basic Phone/contacts, Calendar, Photos, Stocks, Weather, Clock, Calculator, Notes, and Settings apps. However, many features like MMS, apps, and copy and paste were not supported at release, leading hackers jailbreaking their phones to add these features. Software updates from Apple gradually added these functions.

A v1.1 update alongside the introduction of the iPod Touch in September 2007 included an iTunes Store app that was the first new app to be added to the system.

iPhone OS 2 was released on July 11, 2008, at the same time as the release of the iPhone 3G, and introduced Apple's App Store supporting native third-party applications, Microsoft Exchange support, push e-mail, and other enhancements.

iPhone OS 3 was released on June 17, 2009, alongside the iPhone 3GS, and introduced copy and paste functionality, Spotlight search for the home screen, and new features for the YouTube app. iPhone OS 3 was available for the original iPhone as well as the iPhone 3G and 3GS. However, not all features of iPhone OS 3 (like MMS in the Messages app) were supported on the original iPhone.

iPhone OS 3.1.3 was the last version of iPhone OS (now iOS) to be released for this phone in February 2010, which never got the full iPhone OS 3 feature set because iPhone OS 3.2 was intended for the iPad.

Almost all apps released after the release of iOS 6 in late September 2012 do not run on the original iPhone, as the software development kit (SDK) was changed to no longer allow the "targeting" (minimum) of iOS versions older than 4.3 (including 3.x), or ARMv6 devices (first two generations).

Reception 
The original iPhone received largely positive reviews. Only four writers were given review models of the original iPhone: David Pogue of The New York Times, Walt Mossberg of The Wall Street Journal, Steven Levy of Newsweek, and Ed Baig of USA Today. The New York Times and The Wall Street Journal published positive, but cautious, reviews of the iPhone, their primary criticisms being the relatively slow speed of the AT&T's 2.5G EDGE network and the phone's inability to connect using 3G services. The Wall Street Journals technology columnist, Walt Mossberg, concluded that "despite some flaws and feature omissions, the iPhone is, on balance, a beautiful and breakthrough handheld computer." Time magazine named it the Invention of the Year in 2007.

See also 
 300-page iPhone bill
 Apple Newton
 Comparison of smartphones
 History of iPhone
 List of iOS devices
 Timeline of iPhone models

References

External links 

  – official site

Mobile phones introduced in 2007
Computer-related introductions in 2007
 
Products and services discontinued in 2008
Discontinued flagship smartphones